Surgeon Island is the largest of the Lyall Islands, lying 4 miles east-southeast of Cape Hooker off the northern coast of Victoria Land, Antarctica. It was mapped by the USGS from surveys and U.S. Navy air photos, 1960–63. Its name, given by the US-ACAN, conforms to the names of the other islands in the group, which, along with Cape Hooker, were named after surgeons who worked in Antarctica.

References 

Islands of Victoria Land
Pennell Coast